Alice Helen Warrender (1857 – 23 September 1947) was an English philanthropist, who established one of Britain's earliest annual literary awards, the Hawthornden Prize, in 1919.

Life
Alice Warrender was born at Hawthornden as the eldest child of six of Sir George Warrender, 6th Baronet (1825–1901) and Helen Purves-Hume-Campbell. Her younger brother was the admiral Sir George Warrender, 7th Baronet. In 1919 she founded the Hawthornden Prize for a work of imaginative literature, including biography, by an English writer under the age of 41. Winners received £100 and a silver medal.

Alice Warrender was a judge on the committee awarding the prize until her death. She never married, and is buried at St Martin's Church, Ruislip.

References

1857 births
1947 deaths
English philanthropists
Daughters of baronets